Jean Neves da Silva (born 29 January 1987) is a Brazilian football player who currently plays for Rondonópolis Esporte Clube. He began his career at Albanian side KS Apolonia Fier.

External links 
 

1987 births
Living people
Brazilian footballers
Association football midfielders
Brazilian expatriate footballers
Expatriate footballers in Albania
KF Apolonia Fier players
Brazilian expatriate sportspeople in Albania
Cuiabá Esporte Clube players